Shandel Senior (born 28 February 1999) is a Jamaican international footballer who plays for Daytona SC in USL League Two as well as the Daytona State Falcons. Senior plays as a midfielder or a defender.

Career

Club
Born in  Hayes, Senior has played club football for Jamalco, Vere United, Fraser's Whip and Daytona State Falcons. Senior joined USL League Two expansion club Daytona SC in 2019. He was named to League Two's Top 50 Prospect list.

International
He made his international debut for Jamaica in 2018. Senior also played for the Jamaica u20 national team in November 2018.

References

1999 births
Living people
Jamaican footballers
Jamaica international footballers
Jamalco F.C. players
National Premier League players
Association football midfielders
Jamaican expatriate footballers
Jamaican expatriate sportspeople in the United States
Expatriate soccer players in the United States
USL League Two players
Jamaica under-20 international footballers
People from Clarendon Parish, Jamaica